James Taylor is an English professional footballer who plays for Cheltenham Town, on loan from Bristol City, as a defender.

Career
Taylor began his career with Bristol City, moving on loan to Bath City in September 2020, and on loan to Cheltenham Town in July 2022.

References

2000s births
Living people
English footballers
Bristol City F.C. players
Bath City F.C. players
Cheltenham Town F.C. players
Association football defenders